Sabine Elisabeth Winton (born 24 April 1965) is an Australian politician. She has been a Labor member of the Western Australian Legislative Assembly since the 2017 state election, representing Wanneroo. She currently serves as a Minister for Early Childhood Education; Child Protection; Prevention of Family and Domestic Violence and Community Services.

Prior to being elected in 2017, Winton was a teacher for 27 years and also served on the City of Wanneroo Council from 2013 to 2017.

Early life and teaching career 
Winton was born in Ober-Ramstadt in what was then West Germany. In 1973, her family moved from Dieburg to Fairy Meadow near Wollongong, New South Wales. In 1975, Winton's family travelled across the Nullarbor Plain to settle in Yanchep, Western Australia. Winton attended Yanchep Primary School and then Wanneroo Secondary College where she was President of the Student Council. She also played netball at Wanneroo District Netball Association.

After graduating from Murdoch University with a primary teaching degree, she worked across the state, including in the Goldfields town of Norseman and Fitzroy Crossing in the Kimberley. She also worked on the Cocos Keeling Islands before relocating back to Wanneroo to start a family.

Before being elected in 2017, she was a primary school teacher for 27 years, most recently coordinating and teaching the Primary Extension and Challenge (PEAC) classes in the North Metropolitan Area

Political career

Election 
Winton was elected in the 2017 State election with a swing of 18.2% towards her, becoming one of 7 people who defeated a sitting Minister at that election.

In 2021 she was re-elected with a further swing of 19.8%, achieving a two-party preferred result of 78.4% against Paul Miles who ran again.

Parliamentary appointments 
Winton was an Acting Speaker of the Western Australian Legislative Assembly during the 40th Parliament from 16 March 2017 to 7 December 2020.

During the 40th Parliament she was also a member of the Education and Health Standing Committee. In August 2020, Winton established the WA Parliamentary Friends of Germany Group to foster friendly social and cultural ties between Western Australia and Germany and provide opportunities for Members of Parliament to establish and strengthen relationships with the German community in Western Australia.

After the 2021 Western Australian state election Winton was promoted and appointed as the Parliamentary Secretary to the Parliamentary Secretary to the Premier; Treasurer; Minister for Public Sector Management; Federal-State Relations. As part of this role she is the Chair of the steering committee for the Aboriginal Cultural Centre project.

In December 2021 she was additional made the Parliamentary Secretary to the Deputy Premier; Minister for State Development, Jobs and Trade; Tourism; Commerce; Science.

In December 2022 she was promoted to Cabinet as the Minister for Early Childhood Education; Child Protection; Prevention of Family and Domestic Violence and Community Services following a reshuffle.

Election results

2021 state election

2017 state election

References 

1965 births
Living people
Australian Labor Party members of the Parliament of Western Australia
Members of the Western Australian Legislative Assembly
Australian schoolteachers
Women members of the Western Australian Legislative Assembly
21st-century Australian politicians
21st-century Australian women politicians